Peter Newton may refer to:

Peter Newton (kayaker) (born 1970), American sprint kayaker
Peter Newton (winemaker) (1926–2008), English-born American winemaker